This is a list of the Counts and Dukes of Étampes, a French fief.

Counts of Étampes
 Charles d'Évreux 1327–1336
 Louis I d'Évreux 1336–1400
 John, Duke of Berry 1400–1416
 royal domain
 Richard de Dreux 1421–1438
 royal domain
 John II, Count of Nevers 1442–1465
 Francis II, Duke of Brittany 1465–1478
 John of Foix 1478–1500
 Gaston de Foix 1500–1512
 Anna, Duchess of Brittany 1512–1514
 Claude of France 1514–1515
 Artus Gouffier 1515–1519
 Claude of France 1519–1524
 royal domain
 Jean de La Barre 1526–1534
 Jean IV de Brosse 1534–1536

Dukes of Étampes
 Jean IV de Brosse 1536–1553
 Diane de Poitiers 1553–1562
 Jean IV de Brosse 1562–1564
 royal domain
 John Casimir, Count of the Rhenish Palatinate 1576–1577
 royal domain

Bourbon-Vendôme

 Gabrielle d'Estrées 1598–1599
 César, duc de Vendôme 1599–1665
 Louis, duc de Vendôme 1665–1669
 Louis Joseph, duc de Vendôme 1669–1712

House of Condé and Conti

 Marie Anne de Bourbon 1712–1718 - princesse de Conti - illegitimate daughter of Louis XIV of France
 Louise Élisabeth de Bourbon 1718–1752 - princesse de Conti and niece of the above
 Louise Henriette de Bourbon 1752–1759 - duchesse d'Orléans - daughter of the above

House of Orléans

 Louis Philippe II, Duke of Orléans 1759–1792 - son of the above

 
 
Etampes
Etampes